Suhardi Hassan (born  7 April 1982) is a Malaysian professional racing cyclist currently riding for the Kuala Lumpur Cycling Team.

Career highlights

 2003: 3rd in Stage 3 Jelajah Malaysia, Ipoh (Malaysia)
 2004: 1st in General classification Jelajah Malaysia (Malaysia)
 2005: Gold medal Sea Game 2005 Philippines
 2007: 1st in Stage 6 Tour of Negri Sembilan (Malaysia)
 2007: 2nd in South East Asian Games, Road, Elite (Thailand)
 2010: 1st in Stage 4 Jelajah Malaysia

References

External links

1982 births
Living people
People from Perlis
Malaysian Muslims
Malaysian people of Malay descent
Malaysian male cyclists
Cyclists at the 2006 Asian Games
Southeast Asian Games medalists in cycling
Southeast Asian Games gold medalists for Malaysia
Southeast Asian Games silver medalists for Malaysia
Competitors at the 2007 Southeast Asian Games
Asian Games competitors for Malaysia
20th-century Malaysian people
21st-century Malaysian people